An online dictionary is a dictionary that is accessible via the Internet through a web browser. They can be made available in a number of ways: free, free with a paid subscription for extended or more professional content, or a paid-only service. Many dictionaries have been digitized from their print versions and are available at online libraries. Some online dictionaries are organized as lists of words, similar to a glossary, while others offer search features, reverse lookups, and additional language tools and content such as verb conjugations, grammar references, and discussion forums. The variety of online dictionaries for specialized topics is enormous, covering a wide range of fields such as computing, business and investing, along with almost any other class of trade, science, art, or common interest with its own terminology.

Selected online dictionaries
The following is a concise list of online English dictionaries whose definitions are based upon well-established content.
 American Heritage Dictionary American Heritage Dictionary of the English Language, Fifth Ed.
 Collins Online Dictionary Collins Unabridged English Dictionary; Collins Unabridged Thesaurus; Collins Webster's American English Dictionary
 Dictionary.com Dictionary.com Unabridged, based on the Random House Webster's Unabridged Dictionary
 Merriam-Webster Online Merriam-Webster Online Dictionary
 Oxford Dictionaries Online Oxford Dictionary of English; New Oxford American Dictionary; Oxford Thesaurus of English; Oxford American Writer's Thesaurus

Advanced learner's dictionaries
 Oxford Advanced Learner's Dictionary Oxford Advanced Learner's Dictionary
 Cambridge Dictionaries Online Cambridge Advanced Learner's Dictionary
 Longman Longman Dictionary of Contemporary English
 Macmillan Macmillan English Dictionary for Advanced Learners

Other examples

Multilingual

English language

Other specific languages

See also 
 Electronic dictionary
 Thesaurus
 List of online encyclopedias

References

External links
 

 
Dictionaries
Dictionaries, online